Barnbrook is a surname. Notable people with the surname include:
Jonathan Barnbrook (born 1966), British graphic designer, film maker, and typographer
Richard Barnbrook (born 1961), British politician

English-language surnames